Marionette (lit. Remember Me) is a 2017 South Korean crime thriller film written and directed by Lee Han-wook. The film stars Lee Yoo-young and Kim Hee-won.

Cast
 Lee Yoo-young as Han Seo-rin / Min-ah
A high school teacher who is haunted by a violent man from her past.
 Kim Hee-won as Oh Kook-chul
A former detective who tracks down the mysterious criminal.
 Oh Ha-nee as Yang Se-jung 
 Lee Hak-joo as Kim Dong-jin 
 Kim Da-mi as Yoo Min-ah 
 Lee Je-yeon as Kim Jin-ho 
 Jang Hyuk-jin as Jo Young-jae 
 Ko Kyu-pil as Detective Moon
 Kim Young-sun as Han Soon-jung
 Kang Ji-sub as Woo-hyuk

Production
Marionette is Lee Han-wook's feature directorial debut. Lee previously directed the 2012 mid-length film Hide N Seek, which screened at the Montreal World Film Festival and the Boston International Film Festival.

The film began principal photography in December 2016.

Release
Marionette had its world premiere at the 48th International Film Festival of India in November 2017, where it played in the International Competition section.

On March 12, 2018, the stars and director of Marionette attended a press conference in Seoul to promote the film.

Marionette was released in theaters on April 19, 2018.

References

External links

Marionette at Naver Movies 

2017 films
South Korean mystery thriller films
South Korean crime thriller films
2010s mystery thriller films
2017 crime thriller films
2010s South Korean films